Alexandros Tsoutsis (born 12 October 1991) is a Greek professional footballer who plays as a winger for Super League 2 club Karaiskakis.

References

1991 births
Living people
Greek expatriate footballers
Football League (Greece) players
Super League Greece 2 players
Gamma Ethniki players
Ethnikos Piraeus F.C. players
Apollon Pontou FC players
Doxa Drama F.C. players
Panserraikos F.C. players
FC Fribourg players
Kavala F.C. players
A.E. Karaiskakis F.C. players
Association football wingers
Footballers from Athens
Greek footballers